Berkeley station is an Amtrak station in Berkeley, California, served by Amtrak California's Capitol Corridor service. The station is located under the University Avenue overpass just west of 4th Street. It is served directly by AC Transit bus routes 51B and 802; additionally, AC Transit Transbay routes FS, G, and Z stop nearby at 6th Street.

History

The stop first appeared on timetables as West Berkeley, differentiating it from the then-operating downtown station.

The depot was built by the Southern Pacific in 1913, although it has since been turned into a restaurant.

Amtrak California service at Berkeley began in 1986 with the twice-daily San Joaquins, which then operated between Oakland and Bakersfield. Berkeley was an original stop on the Capitol Corridor (originally named Capitols) when that service began in late 1991. San Joaquins service at Berkeley ended in 1993 because of low ridership. The San Joaquins still pass through the station without stopping.

The current platform opened on September 17, 2005, after a $2.4 million renovation. Additional renovation work included installation of nighttime lighting, benches and landscaping; improved access for people with disabilities; and street repaving and new striping for more efficient access by buses, bicycles, paratransit, shuttles and taxis.

See also
 Berkeley station (Southern Pacific Railroad) for a different Southern Pacific station (now demolished)

References

External links 

Amtrak stations in Alameda County, California
Former Southern Pacific Railroad stations in California
Bus stations in Alameda County, California
Transportation in Berkeley, California
Railway stations in the United States opened in 1913
Railway stations in the United States opened in 1986
Buildings and structures in Berkeley, California
1913 establishments in California